Legend Recognize Legend is the first studio album by American hip hop musician Lazerbeak. It was released on Doomtree Records in 2010.

Track listing

References

External links
 

2010 debut albums
Lazerbeak albums
Doomtree Records albums